The Vărmaga (Hungarian: Bán-patak or Vormágai-patak) is a right tributary of the river Mureș in Romania. It discharges into the Mureș near Chimindia.

References

Rivers of Romania
Rivers of Hunedoara County